Dakor railway station is a railway station on the Western Railway network in the state of Gujarat, India. Dakor railway station is 29 km far away from Anand Junction railway station. MEMU trains halt here.

See also
 Kheda district

References

Railway stations in Kheda district
Vadodara railway division